Kat Blaque is an American YouTuber and activist.

Early life
Blaque was born in Lynwood, California and raised in Walnut, California. She is adopted. In middle school, Blaque began to question her gender identity and started to identify as genderqueer. She began identifying as a trans woman in college. Blaque graduated from the California Institute of the Arts in 2012 with a BFA in character animation.

Career

YouTube
Blaque started video blogging in December 2010. Her YouTube channel Kat Blaque is focused on discussing race, gender, and other social justice issues. Blaque has described herself by saying, "I'm a woman, I'm black, I'm curvy and I'm trans. There are a lot of things that I deal with. When I talk about those things, I am literally talking about my embodiment of these intersections."

In 2017 Blaque started a weekly YouTube series called True Tea where she answers questions that viewers send her about racism, transphobia, black culture and several other topics. Blaque has made guest appearances on several other YouTuber's videos such as the BuzzFeed video about gender pronouns. She has also collaborated with YouTubers such as Franchesca "Chescaleigh" Ramsey and Ari Fitz. The Advocate reports that "Her YouTube videos are shown as educational tools in classrooms".

Illustration
In 2015, Blaque also teamed up with fellow artist and YouTuber Franchesca Ramsey to animate Ramsey's story "Sometimes You're A Caterpillar". This short film addresses privilege and has since been shared on several sites, including Everyday Feminism, Upworthy, Mic, and MTV.

Other ventures
Blaque has contributed to websites such as Everyday Feminism and the Huffington Post's Black Voices section. Blaque participated in a panel on writing transgender characters at San Diego's 2015 Comic-Con and was the keynote speaker at the University of Toledo's LGBTQA History month celebration.

References

External links
 
 Other YouTube channels:
 Kat Blaque 2.0
 ART BITCH

African-American activists
21st-century American artists
21st-century American women artists
21st-century American women writers
21st-century American writers
Activists from California
African-American feminists
American feminists
American women bloggers
American bloggers
American YouTubers
Animators from California
American anti-racism activists
California Institute of the Arts alumni
Internet activists
Intersectional feminism
LGBT African Americans
LGBT animators
LGBT feminists
LGBT people from California
American LGBT rights activists
LGBT YouTubers
Living people
People from Lynwood, California
People from Orange County, California
People from Walnut, California
Sex-positive feminists
Transgender women
Transgender rights activists
Transgender writers
Transfeminists
American women animators
Patreon creators
Year of birth missing (living people)
21st-century American LGBT people